The 2022 NC State Wolfpack football team represented North Carolina State University during the 2022 NCAA Division I FBS football season. The Wolfpack played their home games at Carter–Finley Stadium in Raleigh, North Carolina, and competed as members of the Atlantic Coast Conference. They were led by head coach Dave Doeren, in his 10th season.

Previous season
The Wolfpack finished the 2021 season 9–3, 6–2 in ACC play to finish tied for second place in the Atlantic Division. They received an invitation to the Holiday Bowl where they were scheduled to play UCLA. However, the game was canceled due to COVID-19 issues within the Bruins program.

Coaching staff

Source

Roster

Source

Schedule

NC State announced its 2022 football schedule on January 31, 2022. The 2022 schedule consists of seven home games and five away games in the regular season. The Wolfpack will host ACC foes Boston College, Florida State, Virginia Tech, and Wake Forest and will travel to Clemson, Louisville, North Carolina, and Syracuse.

The Wolfpack will host three of the four non-conference opponents, Charleston Southern from Division I FCS, Texas Tech from the Big 12 and UConn from FBS Independents, and will travel to East Carolina from the American Athletic Conference.

Game summaries

at East Carolina

Charleston Southern

Texas Tech

UConn

at No. 5 Clemson

Florida State

at No. 18 Syracuse

Virginia Tech

No. 21 Wake Forest

Boston College

at Louisville

at No. 17 North Carolina

vs. Maryland–Duke's Mayo Bowl

Rankings

References

NC State
NC State Wolfpack football seasons
NC State Wolfpack football